Ivan Dichevski (born 24 April 2001)  is a Bulgarian professional footballer who plays as a goalkeeper for Spartak Varna.

Career
Dichevski made his league debut for Cherno More in a 4–1 away loss against Ludogorets Razgrad on 24 May 2019, playing the full 90 minutes. 

In the end of 2021 it was announced that Dichevski would leave Cherno More. On 6 February he signed for the local rivals Spartak Varna.

Career statistics

Club

References

External links

2001 births
Living people
Bulgarian footballers
Bulgaria youth international footballers
Association football goalkeepers
First Professional Football League (Bulgaria) players
PFC Cherno More Varna players
PFC Spartak Varna players
Sportspeople from Varna, Bulgaria